The 1970–71 California Golden Seals season was the Seals' fourth in the NHL, but their first as the Golden Seals. Oakland Athletics owner Charlie O. Finley bought the team in the offseason for approximately $4,500,000. He announced a name change in which his team would be called the Bay Area Seals. On October 16, after the first two games of the season, Finley changed the name once again. The team became known as the California Golden Seals in an attempt to draw fans from across the state of California, in particular from nearby San Francisco. Along with the name change came new green and gold colours, and a new logo and uniforms.

Several other changes occurred in the Seals' front office after Finley bought the team. Unhappy, General Manager Frank Selke Jr. quit in October 1970. His replacement, Bill Torrey, lasted only a month before resigning himself. Coach Fred Glover took over the responsibilities of General Manager after Torrey's departure in November.

Amidst the shake-up of the Seals from a business point of view the on-ice performance of the team suffered greatly. The team finished the season with an NHL-worst record of 20-53-5 (45 points). It was the worst season in their history up to that point in time, and the 53 losses set an NHL record (since surpassed). The Seals record was worse than both of the two expansion teams that season, the Buffalo Sabres and the Vancouver Canucks. 

On May 22, 1970, The Seals made a trade with the Montreal Canadiens that would come back to haunt the franchise for the rest of their existence. In the trade, the Seals sent defenseman Francois Lacombe along with their first round draft pick in 1971 to the Montreal Canadiens for Ernie Hicke and Montreal's first round pick. Since the Seals finished with the NHL's worst record that season, that gave the Canadiens the first overall pick in the 1971 draft which they used to select future hall of famer Guy Lafleur.

Captain Ted Hampson was traded to the Minnesota North Stars late in the season, and was replaced by Carol Vadnais.

Offseason

Amateur draft

Regular season

Standings

Schedule and results

Player statistics

Skaters
Note: GP = Games played; G = Goals; A = Assists; Pts = Points; PIM = Penalties in minutes

†Denotes player spent time with another team before joining Seals. Stats reflect time with the Seals only. ‡Traded mid-season

Goaltenders
Note: GP = Games played; TOI= Time on ice (minutes); W = Wins; L = Losses; T = Ties; GA = Goals against; SO = Shutouts; GAA = Goals against average

Transactions
The Seals were involved in the following transactions during the 1970–71 season:

Trades

Additions and subtractions

Awards and records
 Gary Smith, most losses by a goaltender in one season (48)

References
 Golden Seals on Hockey Database
 Golden Seals on Database Hockey

Bibliography

 

California Golden Seals seasons
Cali
Cali
Calif
Calif